Damlataş Cave is a cave in Alanya district of Antalya Province, in southern Turkey.

Location
The cave is located west of Alanya Castle on the coast of Mediterranean Sea in the urban fabric of Alanya. The cave's entrance faces the beach.

History
The cave was discovered accidentally during mining operations at a quarry used for the construction of Alanya Harbor in 1948. After preliminary research by two geologists, it was opened to the public.

The cave
A -long and -high cylindrical cavity leads to the basement of the cave. The cave is full of stalactites and stalagmites that are formed in fifteen thousand years.

The air in the cave contains relatively high percentage of carbondioxide, around 10 to 12 times more than in normal air, and has 95% humidity. The air temperature is  regardless of the season.

Asthma cure
The cave is popularly known as an "asthma-cure cave" due to the widespread belief in its capability of curing respiratory complaints, and asthma. In fact, most of the early visitors were people, who suffered from asthma. In 2010, the municipality of Alanya reported that the cave was visited within seven months by 114,000 tourists of which 2,100 suffered from asthma. In 2014, the number of visitors suffering from asthma reached 4,000.

Visitors, who come for asthma cure, stay 21 days long four hours a day in the cave. Between 6:00 and 10:00 hours local time in the early morning, the cave is open only for asthma-sick visitors. While the entrance fee for tourists cost  4.50, the visitors for cure pay only  0.30.

References

External links

Caves of Antalya Province
Alanya
Tourist attractions in Antalya Province
Medical tourism
Show caves in Turkey